Frost is an unincorporated community in Athens County, in the U.S. state of Ohio.

History
A post office called Frost was established in 1876, and remained in operation until 1976.  The Frost family were among the earliest settlers in the area.

References

Unincorporated communities in Athens County, Ohio
1876 establishments in Ohio
Populated places established in 1876
Unincorporated communities in Ohio